Diane Farrell Wainio (born November 5, 1961) is an American former professional tennis player. She was raised in Binghamton, New York and played collegiate tennis for the University of San Diego.

Farrell, who reached a career best singles ranking of 220, qualified for the main draw at Wimbledon in 1986. All three of her wins in qualifying went beyond 6–6 in the third set, against Cláudia Monteiro, Sabina Simmonds and Elisabeth Ekblom. She lost her first round match to Elizabeth Minter, in three sets.

As a doubles player she was ranked as high as 122 in the world and in addition to Wimbledon also featured in the main draws of the French Open and US Open. She won two ITF doubles titles, including a $25,000 tournament in Hopewell.

She married her husband Fredrick Wainio, an accountant, in 1991.

ITF finals

Doubles: 3 (2–1)

References

External links
 
 

1961 births
Living people
American female tennis players
San Diego Toreros women's tennis players
Tennis people from New York (state)
Sportspeople from Binghamton, New York